The Fairfield District School is a historic schoolhouse in Fairfield, Utah, United States, that is listed on the National Register of Historic Places (NRHP) and is part of the Camp Floyd State Park Museum (a Utah State Park).

Description
The school is located at 59 North Church Street and was built in 1898 by Andrew Fjeld, a local builder. It includes Late Victorian, Eclectic, other architectural styles.

It was listed on the NRHP in August 6, 1987.

See also

 National Register of Historic Places listings in Utah County, Utah

References

External links

 
 

School buildings completed in 1898
School buildings on the National Register of Historic Places in Utah
Victorian architecture in Utah
Schools in Utah County, Utah
Historic American Buildings Survey in Utah
National Register of Historic Places in Utah County, Utah